The 51st (Highland) Division War Memorial is located at the North Inch public park in Perth, Perth and Kinross, Scotland. It is dedicated to the soldiers of the 51st (Highland) Division lost in World War II. It was unveiled on 13 May 1995, marking the 50th anniversary of the conclusion of the war.

The bronze sculptures depict a Highlander piper being handed a rose from a bunch of flowers held by a young Dutch girl. A bronze dedication plaque is mounted on a tablet on the granite base. Another plaque, listing the regiment's battle honours, is at the rear. By the steps leading up to the memorial is a tablet informing the visitor of the memorial's symbolism. Two bronze relief plaques are on the sides of the base; one is a montage of soldiers in the field, the other depicts a gun, an armoured personnel carrier, a tank, medics treating a wounded soldier, a piper leading two soldiers into battle, a chaplain at a burial service and three lorries at a depot.

References

1995 sculptures
1995 establishments in Scotland
Monuments and memorials in Scotland
Outdoor sculptures in Scotland
Statues in Scotland
Bronze sculptures
World War II memorials in Scotland